Benoît Huré (born 5 June 1953 in Sépeaux) is a French politician and a member of the Senate of France. He represents the Ardennes department and is a member of the Union for a Popular Movement Party.

References
Page on the Senate website

1953 births
Living people
People from Yonne
Rally for the Republic politicians
Union for a Popular Movement politicians
Gaullism, a way forward for France
French Senators of the Fifth Republic
Senators of Ardennes (department)